Shekou International School is a private, not-for-profit international school in Shekou, Nanshan District, Shenzhen, Guangdong, China. It serves students in Nursery through to Grade 12 across three campuses.

Grades Nursery through Kindergarten are located in the Jingshan Campus (formerly the Mountainside Campus, located in the Jing Shan Villas  development. The secondary students attend Netvalley. There is also The Bay campus for grades one through five.

 it is one of eight schools in Shenzhen designated for children of foreign workers. The school includes a section for French primary school students.

Shekou International School is fully accredited by the Western Association of Schools and Colleges (WASC) and offers the IB Diploma program in the high school. The school is also a member of the East Asian Council of Overseas Schools (EARCOS), the Association for the Advancement of International Education (AAIE) and a member of All-China and Mongolia International School (ACAMIS) organization.

History
The school was opened in 1988, funded by four oil companies: Amoco, Arco, CACT and Phillips.  Shekou International School currently has over 800 students from 40 different countries. They are made up of 20% Americans, 55% Asians, and 20% Europeans. Over 90 teachers from the United States, France, Canada, the United Kingdom, New Zealand, Australia, the Philippines, and China make up the faculty. The student-to-staff ratio is less than 10:1.

It is Shenzhen's oldest international school.

Campuses
SIS provides physical education classes by leasing an off-site gymnasium owned by another entity.

Coordinates:
Nursery-K Campus (Mountainside) 22.484943,113.9061
6-12 Campus (Net Valley) 22.487555,113.921362
1-5 Campus (The Bay)

See also 

 Shenzhen Yucai

Notes

References

External links
 

High schools in Shenzhen
International schools in Shenzhen
International Baccalaureate schools in China
Private schools in Guangdong
Association of China and Mongolia International Schools